Ohio is a village in Bureau County, Illinois, United States. The population was 465 at the 2020 census. It is part of the Ottawa Micropolitan Statistical Area.

History
Ohio was first incorporated as a village on January 22, 1877. A post office called Ohio has been in operation since 1854. The village was named after the state of Ohio.

Geography
Ohio is located at  (41.556900, -89.460995).

Demographics

As of the 2020 census there were 465 people, 227 households, and 150 families residing in the village. The racial makeup of the village was 92.90% White, 0.65% African American, 0.65% Asian, 0.65% from other races, and 5.16% from two or more races. Hispanic or Latino of any race were 2.15% of the population.

There were 227 households, out of which 25.11% had children under the age of 18 living with them, 39.65% were married couples living together, 25.11% had a female householder with no husband present, and 33.92% were non-families. 31.28% of all households were made up of individuals, and 16.30% had someone living alone who was 65 years of age or older. The average household size was 2.62 and the average family size was 2.22.

The village's age distribution consisted of 12.8% under the age of 18, 10.2% from 18 to 24, 26.7% from 25 to 44, 30.2% from 45 to 64, and 20.0% who were 65 years of age or older. The median age was 45.2 years. For every 100 females, there were 89.2 males. For every 100 females age 18 and over, there were 100.0 males.

The median income for a household in the village was $60,208, and the median income for a family was $61,944. Males had a median income of $49,500 versus $14,489 for females. The per capita income for the village was $31,656. About 1.3% of families and 13.0% of the population were below the poverty line, including none of those under age 18 and 16.5% of those age 65 or over.

Education 
Public education in Ohio is provided by Ohio Community Consolidated Grade School District #17 and Ohio Community High School District #505. The district maintains a single building with both Elementary and Jr./Sr. High School.  Each district is administrated by a seven-member Board of Education, which includes a president and vice president. Ohio has formed cooperative teams with Amboy and LaMoille school districts for several team sports. Ohio is located within the Sauk Valley Community College district with tuition and fees at the in-district rate.

References

Villages in Bureau County, Illinois
Villages in Illinois
Ronald Reagan Trail
Ottawa, IL Micropolitan Statistical Area
1854 establishments in Illinois
Populated places established in 1854